Rita Sarimah anak Patrick Insol is a politician from Parti Rakyat Sarawak. She has been a member of the Dewan Negara since 2020 after being appointed by the Yang di-Pertuan Agong.

Politics 
She is currently the Deputy General Secretary for Parti Rakyat Sarawak.

Election result

References 

University of Malaya alumni
Parti Rakyat Sarawak politicians
Members of the Dewan Negara
Women members of the Dewan Negara
Living people
Year of birth missing (living people)